Système D is the fourth studio album by French pop rock group Les Rita Mitsouko.  It was released in 1993 and reached number seven on the French Albums Chart. Système D includes the singles "Y’A D’La Haine", "Les Amants", and "Femme d’Affaires".

The album was recorded and produced by Fred Chichin and Catherine Ringer largely at a large Moroccan house situated in Essaouira (Formerly Mogador), where the group set up their studio. Initially the group had intended to produce the album with veteran producer Tony Visconti, having previously worked together on the group's previous two albums. Ringer and Chichin chose to produce the album themselves to find a new sound. The album was completed in the Parisian studios of Studio 6, Studio Davout, and Studio Mega. The album was mixed by American mixer Carmen Rizzo in Studio Davout.

Receiving good reviews the album was originally released as a double-LP, Cassette and CD in November 1993. The artwork was designed and photographed by Achay, Catherine Ringer and Sednaoui.

Track listing

Personnel

Musicians
 Fred Chichin - bass (1-3, 8, 10, 11, 14), Guitar (all), sampler (2)
 Gerald Manceau - drums (all), percussion (1, 2, 12-14), organ (1), bass (2), electric percussion (3)
 Catherine Ringer - vocals (all), yukulele (2), keyboards (3-6, 8, 9, 12), bass (6, 7, 12), acoustic guitar (14), synthesizer (14)
 DJ Dee Nasty - scratches (2-4, 10, 11)
 Marina Xavier - vocals (2, 11)
 Noel Assoolo - bass (4, 5, 13)
 Richard Galliano - accordion (5, 12)
 Jermone - wind harp (6)
 Richie Cannata - saxophone (8, 10)
 Iggy Pop - vocals (8)
 Georges Bonastre - end guitar solo (11)

Technical and visual
 Les Rita Mitsouko - producer
 Carmen Rizzo - mixing (at Davout, Paris)
 Raphael - mastering (at Translab, Paris)
 Gerald Manceau - all programming
 Monte Christo - mixing coordination
 Jacques Robackowski - studio setting and maintenance in Morocco
 Pascal Garnon, Jeff, Yo, Patrice, Nicholas - assistants
 Achay, Catherine Ringer, Sednaoui - design, photography
 Studio Favre, Lhaik - artwork coordination

External links
Système D release history

References

1993 albums
Virgin Records albums
Les Rita Mitsouko albums